Macross 82-99 (stylized as マクロス MACROSS 82-99 or MACROXX 82-99) is a Mexican electronic music producer and DJ from Mexico City, based out of Osaka, Japan. His music combines elements of plunderphonics, disco, jazz fusion, house, hip hop and city pop, and commonly makes use of video games, Japanese pop culture, as well as 80s and 90s anime, most notably Sailor Moon, as aesthetic tropes. Macross 82-99's 2013 albums ネオ東京 (English: Neo Tokyo) and SAILORWAVE, along with musical cohort Saint Pepsi's Hit Vibes, are commonly cited as the origin point for the "future funk" subgenre of vaporwave, which combines the sample-based production approach and visual language of vaporwave with French house and dance music influences. The "82-99" in the artist's stage name refers to the fact that Super Dimension Fortress Macross, the anime which sonically and visually inspired him during the beginnings of the project, was broadcast in 1982, while the story took place in the year 1999.

Career 
Macross 82-99's music has been described as, "where J-pop and disco samples meet ambient atmospheres and vaporwave aesthetics." He has collaborated with artists such as Yung Bae, Sarah Midori Perry, and Ranma ½ composer Hideharu Mori. Macross 82-99's track "Fun Tonight", a remix of Armenta's 1983 record "I Wanna Be With You", has over 15 million streams on Spotify. Prior to its deletion from the YouTube channel Artzie Music, "Fun Tonight" had over 10 million views across multiple uploads on the platform. As a member of Sailor Team, a music collective of future funk and French house producers, Macross 82-99 has toured across Asia and North America.

Music Distribution 
With the exception of 2013's [夏日], which had a limited run split album cassette release with Architecture in Tokyo's Summer Paradise on the Business Casual label, all early singles and projects were available exclusively to stream and as digital downloads on free and pay-what-you-want music sites like SoundCloud and Bandcamp, along with video uploads on YouTube. Since 2017, with the re-release of A Million Miles Away on cassette tape, Hong Kong based music label Neoncity Records has released multiple albums physically on limited run cassette, vinyl, and CD, influenced by the vinyl record revival of the 2010s and with a desire to bring vaporwave cassette culture over to the future funk scene. Label founder and owner Davy Law expressed that the success of this release is what convinced him to pursue his label as a legitimate business.

Discography

See also
Skylar Spence
Yung Bae
Vaporwave
French house
Remix culture
City Pop

References

External links
Official Bandcamp page
Official YouTube channel

Vaporwave musicians
Electronic musicians
Hispanic and Latino American musicians